Steve Nielsen (born 2 July 1964) is a British engineer working in Formula One motor racing.

Career
After leaving school in 1985 Nielsen trained as a police officer but resigned after 11 months. 
He then worked as a truck driver for a Formula One catering company. In 1986, he joined Team Lotus' test team, before running their spare parts department. In 1991, he moved to Tyrrell in the same role before being appointed assistant team manager in 1994. In the next five years he moved to Benetton, back to Tyrrell, to Honda, then Arrows, before moving back to Benetton, where he spent almost a decade as Sporting Director, including the team's transitions to Renault F1 and Lotus Renault GP.

After spending 2012 as Sporting Director at Caterham, Nielsen joined Scuderia Toro Rosso at the start of the 2013 season. He joined Williams as Sporting Manager in December 2014  and worked in that role until leaving in July 2017.

On 1 August 2017 he started in a new position as the Sporting Director of Formula One. He left this role and became the FIA Sporting Director on 18 January 2023.

References

1964 births
Living people
Formula One engineers
British automotive engineers
Scuderia Toro Rosso
Williams Grand Prix Engineering